Mount French is a rural locality in the Scenic Rim Region, Queensland, Australia.

Geography 
The town of Mount French includes the mountain of the same name in the western half of the locality, part of which is within the Moogerah Peaks National Park.

 Mount French (North Peak, also known as Mee-bor-rum), 
 Mount French (South Peak, also known as Punchagin), 

The western half of the locality is mostly undeveloped bushland.

Mount French is a watershed with the creeks flowing west of the mountain ultimately flowing into the Bremer River, while the creeks flowing east of the mountain ultimately flow into the Logan River.

Mount French Road runs from the Boonah-Rathdowney Road in Boonah and Dugandan to the east through the centre of the locality to the national park and then north to the North Peak.

History 

Mount French Provisional School opened in 1900. On 1 January 1909, it became Mount  French State School. It closed circa 1925.

The locality contains 53 households, in which 50.0% of the population are males and 50.0% of the population are females with a median age of 54, 16 years above the national average. The average weekly household income is $985, $453 below the national average.

History of Mount French State School 
C.L. Watson sent a letter dated 31 July 1899 on behalf of parents in the Dugandan community, to the Secretary for Public Instruction requesting the establishment of a provisional school at Mount French East. Ernest Kirchner donated and transferred 2 acres 0 roods 25 perches subdivision 1 Portion 303 Coochin for the site of the school 1 February 1900.  A subsidised Provisional School was approved 17 April 1900 with a subsidy payable of £74-15-6.  The following tenders had been submitted for the construction of the school building: Edward Scholz £87-12-6 and Tronc and Sons £93-10-0. The committee was authorized to accept Scholz’s tender. The building was completed 13 October 1900. The following school committee was appointed: Charles Graewe, Edward A Scholz and F William Hemmy (secretary) 20 February 1901.

The first teacher was Alice Watson wife of C L Watson secretary to the building committee for the Mount French School and a local farmer. She started 19 November 1900. She had taught for ten years as the first assistant at Central Infants Brisbane and was classified Class III Division I.

The school committee 9 March 1906 consisted of Albert Spletter: treasurer, Henry Falkenhagen: secretary, William Crepin: member and Mr Frank: chairman.,  school committee consisted of Fredrick William Krause: chairman, Henry Frank: secretary, John Carl Frank: treasurer, with Charles William Fredrick Freiberg and William Crepin being members 21 March 1923.

In August 1923 children broke into the school and broke the school clock and some set squares belonging to the pupils.

Over the years the number of pupils varied. According to the annual returns from 1900 to 1925 the average attendance ranged from 9 to 25.
The teachers at the school were:
 Alice Watson 1900-1901
 Alice Casey 1902-1904
 Joseph A Dixon 1905-1907
 Michael O’Connor 1908-1910
 Nan E Bott 1911-1912
 Katherine Dwyer 1913
 Hamilton L Bourke 1914-1915
 M Ewing 1916
 Lorenz A Krebs 1917
 L Ewing 1918
 Hiltoy 1919-1920
 Mary Robb 1922-1924
 Annie Mackay 1925
The school closed at the end of 1925 with teacher Annie Mackay being reassigned to part time schools at Carlyle and Jandowae East. The school building was moved and relocated to Mount Walker Lower in 1927.

The school site was transferred back to Ernest Kirchner 20 March 1928 with certificate of title number 156877.

Education 
There are no schools in Mount French. The nearest government primary school and secondary school are Boonah State School and Boonah State High School, both in neighbouring Boonah to the east.

Attractions 
The Mount French area within the Moogerah Peaks National Park offers a number of walking tracks for people of varying levels of bushwalking experience. The easiest walk (suitable for wheelchairs with assistance) includes Logan's Lookout (also known as North Cliff Lookout  with panoramic views over the Fassifern Valley.

References

External links 

Scenic Rim Region
Localities in Queensland